Norman Warwick (14 July 1920 – 26 August 1994) was a British cinematographer.

Selected filmography
 Tons of Trouble (1956)
 You Can't Escape (1956)
 Small Hotel (1957)
 The Young and the Guilty (1958)
 A Lady Mislaid (1958)
 Follow That Horse! (1960)
 The Last Valley (1971)
 Dr Jekyll & Sister Hyde (1971)
 The Abominable Dr. Phibes (1971)
 Confessions of a Window Cleaner (1974)
 Son of Dracula (1974)

References

Bibliography
 Muir, John Kenneth. Horror Films of the 1970s. McFarland, 2002.

External links

1920 births
1994 deaths
Film people from London
British cinematographers